Samartha Vashishtha (born 1983) is an Indian poet writing in English and Hindi, his mothertongue. He has published three volumes of poems; two in English — Anhadnad, a collection of his childhood poems in the year 2000 and Shadows Don't Live in Walls in 2004 — and a book of poems in Hindi titled Sapne Mein Piya Pani (Rajkamal Prakashan, 2017). He won a Poetry Chain-Poetry Society (India) Annual Poetry Prize in 2003 for his poem-sequence, Simla.

Samartha has also contributed extensively to prominent Indian literary journals. His work in English has appeared in Chandrabhaga edited by Jayanta Mahapatra, Sahitya Akademi's Indian Literature, The Journal of Literature and Aesthetics, The Journal of the Poetry Society (India) and Poetry Chain. His poems in Hindi have appeared in Pahal, an influential literary magazine brought out by Gyanaranjan from Jabalpur, Naya Gyanodaya, Vartaman Sahitya (Ghaziabad), and Sahitya Akademi's Samakaleen Bharatiya Sahitya besides several other publications.

Works
Samartha has published three volumes of poetry: 

 Anhadnad (a book of poems in English published in the year 2000)
 Shadows Don't Live in Walls (published in the year 2004)
 Sapne Mein Piya Pani (a book of Hindi poems published by Rajkamal Prakashan in the year 2017)

Translation
Samartha is a co-translator (along with Shailendra Shail) of Soumitra Mohan's long Hindi poem, Luqman Ali (लुक़मान अली) into English. The translation was published in Chandrabhaga 14/2007 and then in Asymptote. Luqman Ali is widely considered a landmark poem in Hindi literature, and Samartha's co-translation of it made it accessible to a new generation of readers. In the foreword to his volume of collected poems, आधा दिखता वह आदमी, Soumitra Mohan acknowledges the role of this translation in introducing Luqman Ali to an international readership.

Samartha has also translated the poetry of Langston Hughes into Hindi, and the works of Paash, Vyomesh Shukla and Asad Zaidi into English. He continues to work across three languages — English, Hindi and Punjabi — consistently striving to build bridges between their literatures.

Personal life
Samartha was born in 1983 into a literary family. His grandfather, Prof. Khushi Ram Vashishtha (1916-2004), was a poet of repute in the Indian state of Haryana. In 1968, Prof. Vashishtha was bestowed with the honorary title of Rajya Kavi (State Poet of Haryana); the first of the only two poets to ever earn this honor. Samartha's father, Dr Jitendra Vashishtha (1953-2018), a renowned poet himself, published three volumes of poems in his lifetime, and left behind several unpublished manuscripts in the wake of his untimely death. Shailendra Shail, noted Hindi poet and memoirist, is Samartha's paternal uncle.

For over a decade, Samartha worked with Adobe Systems, where he led the user-assistance content activities for Photoshop, earning the informal title of "Chief Content Wrangler" on the credits splash screen for the 19.x releases. After subsequent stints with Expedia Group and Atlassian, he is currently working at Facebook / Meta as a Sr. Content Design Manager in London.

He is married and has a daughter.

References

External links
Professional website and portfolio
An online anthology of his poems in English
Simla, a long poem
Translation of Soumitra Mohan's' Luqman Ali' in Asymptote
'Gravity' in Grey Sparrow Press Journal
'A Poem for Naipaul' in Grey Sparrow Press Journal
Translation | 'What I Wanted to Write' in Asymptote
Poetry blog in Hindi

21st-century Indian poets
English-language poets from India
Hindi-language poets
1983 births
Living people
20th-century Indian translators
Hindi–English translators
Poets from Haryana
Indian male poets
21st-century Indian male writers